Binjharpur (Sl. No.: 48) is a Vidhan Sabha constituency of Jajpur district, Odisha.

Area of this constituency includes Binjharpur block and 12 GPs (Biripata, Asanpur, Palatpur, Khannagar, Kamardihi, Nizampur, Duttapur, Bihari, Gramnandipur, Thalkudi, Kayan and Chasakhanda) of Dasarathpur block.

Elected Members

15 elections held during 1951 to 2014. Elected members from the Binjharpur constituency are:
2019: (48): Pramila Mallik (BJD)
2014: (48): Pramila Mallik (BJD)
2009: (48): Pramila Mallik (BJD) 
2004: (29): Pramila Mallik (BJD) 
2000: (29): Pramila Mallik (BJD)
1995: (29): Arjun Das (Congress)
1990: (29): Pramila Mallik (Janata Dal)
1985: (29): Nabakishore Mallick (Congress)
1980: (29): Nabakishore Mallick (Congress)
1977: (29): Santanu Kumar Das (Janata Party)
1974: (29): Baishmab Charan Malik (Congress)
1971: (25): Pabitramohan Jena (Orissa Jana Congress)
1967: (25): Baishmab Charan Malik (Praja Socialist Party)
1961: (114): Chittaranjan Nayak (Congress)
1957: (81): Bankabehari Das (Praja Socialist Party)
1951: (64): Padmanava Roy (Congress)

2019 Election Result

2014 Election Results
In 2014 election, Biju Janata Dal candidate Pramila Mallik defeated Indian National Congress candidate Babita Mallick by a margin of 38,190 votes.

2009 Election Result
In 2009 election, Biju Janata Dal candidate Pramila Mallik defeated Indian National Congress candidate Babita Mallick by a margin of 31,861 votes.

Notes

References

Assembly constituencies of Odisha
Jajpur district